Joerie Church (born 23 March 1998) is a Dutch professional footballer who plays as a defender for HHC Hardenberg.

Club career
Church made his Eerste Divisie debut for Jong AZ on 18 August 2017 in a game against FC Den Bosch.

References

External links
 
 

Living people
1998 births
People from Schagen
Dutch footballers
Footballers from Surrey
Association football defenders
Eerste Divisie players
Tweede Divisie players
Regionalliga players
Jong AZ players
SV Rödinghausen players
HHC Hardenberg players
Dutch expatriate footballers
Dutch expatriate sportspeople in Germany
Expatriate footballers in Germany
Footballers from North Holland